So-Called Chaos is the sixth studio album (fourth released internationally) by Canadian singer-songwriter Alanis Morissette, released on May 18, 2004, through Maverick Records. It was preceded by the single "Everything" on April 13, which went on to become Morissette's lowest peaking song on the US Billboard Hot 100 at number 76. The album was met with mixed reviews from critics upon release, with some calling it her most accessible record since Jagged Little Pill (1995) while others criticized the project's confusing messages and felt the singer had lost what made her a cultural icon of the 90's.

With 115,000 copies sold in its opening week, So-Called Chaos debuted at number five on the Billboard 200 and became Morissette's first studio album not to open atop the chart. It failed to surpass predecessor Under Rug Swept (2002), which debuted at number-one with 215,000 first week sales. Two subsequent singles, "Out Is Through" and "Eight Easy Steps", were released in July and October respectively, but neither managed to help improve album sales and both songs failed to enter the Hot 100.

Background and release
It had been two years since Morissette released her fifth studio album, Under Rug Swept. In that time she had met her then fiancé Ryan Reynolds, inspiring many of the songs she wrote for So-Called Chaos. The album found her in a more contented and relaxed state than her previous output, and her songs were brighter and happier than her more volatile works like "You Oughta Know" and "Uninvited". One reporter asked if the song "This Grudge" was based on the same person as "You Oughta Know", and Morissette replied, "Different person, same era."

The first single, "Everything", was released to US radio in the spring of 2004, and was met with mixed reaction. US Adult Top 40 radio stations gave the song good airplay, but mainstream and top 40 stations were colder in their reception, and consequently it became Morissette's lowest peaking single on the Billboard Hot 100. "Everything" was included on the Totally Hits 2004, Vol. 2 compilation, and in 2006 it was featured in the film Clerks II.

Critical reception

Some reviews of So-Called Chaos were positive, with many critics calling it her most accessible and mainstream record since her debut Jagged Little Pill (1995). Still, others thought she had "sold out" for the sake of sales and radio play; Rolling Stone magazine, for example, said the album "attempts to reverse the sliding record sales following [Jagged Little Pill]."

Commercial performance
The album debuted at number two on the Canadian albums chart with first week sales of 11,200, and at number five on the US Billboard 200, selling 115,000 copies in its first week in the US and 287,000 that same week worldwide. In the United States, So-Called Chaos became Morissette's first album to miss the number-one spot. It spent a week in the US top ten before falling down the chart. As of March 2012, the album has sold 474,000 copies in the US. The second single outside the US was "Out Is Through", which had a poor showing in the UK. The second US single was "Eight Easy Steps", which, despite being accompanied by an elaborate music video, failed to chart on the Hot 100 or cause a significant increase in sales of the album, which had already fallen off the Billboard 200. "Excuses" was released as a radio single in Brazil, where it peaked outside the top 40.

Track listing

Personnel
Alanis Morissette – vocals, producer, piano, keyboards, art direction
Eric Avery – bass guitar
Kenny Aronoff – drums
Paul Bushnell – bass
Scott Gordon – programming, engineer, drum programming
Jamie Muhoberac – keyboards
Tim Thorney – acoustic guitar, electric guitar, bass, piano, keyboards, producer
Joel Shearer – acoustic guitar, bouzouki, guitar, electric guitar
Paul Livingstone – sitar
John Shanks – guitar, bass, keyboards, producer
Zac Rae – piano, keyboards, vibraphone
David Levita – acoustic guitar, electric guitar
Jeff Rothschild – programming, engineer
Jason Orme – electric guitar
Blair Sinta – drums, programming
Technical
Mark Valentine – engineer
Bill Lane, Kevin Mills, Errin Familia, Rich Tosi, Jason Wormer – assistant engineer
Chris Lord-Alge – mixing
Stephen Marcussen – mastering
Frank Maddocks – art direction, design
Shari Sutcliffe – project coordinator
Sheryl Nields – photography

Charts

Weekly charts

Year-end charts

Singles

Other charts

1 Remixes

Certifications

Notes

References
"Alanis Morissette - Everything". MusicSquare.net. Retrieved December 1, 2006.
"Alanis Morissette - Out Is Through". MusicSquare.net. Retrieved December 1, 2006.

External links

Alanis Morissette albums
2004 albums
Maverick Records albums
Albums produced by John Shanks